Piletocera aequalis is a moth in the family Crambidae. It was described by Francis Walker in 1866. It is found in New Guinea.

References

aequalis
Moths of New Guinea
Moths described in 1866